Xenosoma bryki is a moth in the subfamily Arctiinae first described by Hering in 1943. It is found in Colombia.

References

Arctiinae